FC Baltika-Tarko Kaliningrad was a Russian football team from Kaliningrad. It played professionally for one season in the Russian Second Division in 2004, when in came 15th in the West Zone. It was cooperating with FC Baltika Kaliningrad as its farm club, but was not formally owned by FC Baltika. After the 2004 season it was dissolved.

Team name and location history
 1999–2001: FC Tarko Kaliningrad
 2002–2004: FC Baltika-Tarko Kaliningrad

External links
  Team history by footballfacts

Association football clubs established in 1999
Association football clubs disestablished in 2005
Football clubs in Russia
Sport in Kaliningrad
1999 establishments in Russia
2005 disestablishments in Russia